"Kuroneko no Tango" ( "Black Cat Tango"; originally  "I wanted a black cat") is a tango song recorded in 1969 by young children in Italy and Japan.
　
The original Italian version came third in the Zecchino d'Oro competition on 11 March 1969. It was written by "Framario" (Francesco and Mario Pagano), Armando Soricillo, and Francesco Saverio Maresca, and was sung by four-year-old Vincenza Pastorelli. In 2007, Pastorelli was arrested after an anti-prostitution operation dubbed "Gatto Nero" by Carabinieri; her appeal against a three-year prison sentence was pending in the Court of Cassation in October 2011.

Nippon Victor asked the leader of a Japanese school choir called "The Larks" to nominate a member to record a Japanese-language version of the song. She chose her nephew, Osamu Minagawa 皆川 おさむ (born 22 January 1963), whose recording was released on 5 October 1969. The song reached number one in the Oricon chart, and sold 3 million copies, making six-year-old Minagawa the youngest artist ever to have a million-selling record.

The Japanese lyrics bear no relation to the Italian ones beyond the central idea of a black cat. The Italian version is a children's song in which the singer complains at being given a white cat instead of a black one. The Japanese "black cat" symbolises the singer's flighty sweetheart, although Minagawa understood "Tango" to be the cat's name.

The song has been covered many times since 1969. The song was covered in Japanese by Ami Tokito and in French by Japanese folk band めめ, both in 2005, and Meg recorded a cover of  the original Italian song on her 2012 album La Japonaise. Justin Mauriello's 2010 Japanese release Justin Sings the Hits includes a version.
The song has a Hebrew version originally performed by Tzipi Shavit with words by Yoram Taharlev, called "Kulam Halkhu LaJambo' " (Hebrew: כולם הלכו לג'מבו "Everybody Went to the Jumbo jet"). In Danish, the song is called “Min Kat Den Danser Tango” (meaning “My Cat Dances Tango”).

The song is on the 2014 album Dream a Little Dream by Pink Martini  and The von Trapps.

In 1995, South Korean music duo Turbo released a Korean version of the song under the title "Black Cat Nero" ( 검은 고양이 네로 ). 25 years later the South Korean boy group ATEEZ released a remake of the original Korean song after they won on South Korean music variety show "Immortal Song" with the song. They  released the music video of the remake a day before Halloween featuring  Kim Jong-kook, one of the members of the original music duo.

See also
 "Dur dur d'être bébé!" 1992 French single by four-year-old Jordy Lemoine

References

External links
 Volevo Un Gatto Nero (includes lyrics) Zecchino d'Oro official website

Oricon Weekly number-one singles
1969 singles
Japanese children's songs
Japanese-language songs
Tangos
Italian children's songs
Italian-language songs
Tango in Japan
1969 songs